The 2013–14 TVL Premier League or 2013–14 Port Vila Premier League is the 20th season of the Port Vila Premier League top division.

The top four of the league qualify for the 2014 VFF National Super League.

The season lasted from October 18, 2013 to March 22, 2014.

Amicale FC were the champions and Yatel FC relegated to the 2014–15 TVL First Division.

Teams
Amicale FC
Erakor Golden Star
Ifira Black Bird
Shepherds United
Spirit 08
Tafea FC
Tupuji Imere
Yatel FC

Standings

Rounds

Round 1

Round 2

Round 3

Round 4

Round 5

Round 6

Round 7

Round 8

Round 9

Round 10

Round 11

Round 12

Round 13

Round 14

Goal scorers

References

External links
 

Port Vila Football League seasons
Vanuatu
Vanuatu
2013–14 in Vanuatuan football